Ecology and Evolution is a biweekly open-access scientific journal covering all areas of ecology, evolution, and conservation. The Editors in Chief of this journal are Allen Moore, Andrew Beckerman, Jenn Firn, Chris Foote, and Gareth Jenkins.

Abstracting and Indexing 
According to the Journal Citation Reports, the journal has a 2021 impact factor of 3.167. The journal is indexed in Web of Science: Science Citation Index Expanded, BIOSIS Previews, Biological Abstracts, and Scopus.

References

External links

Ecology journals
English-language journals
Wiley-Blackwell academic journals
Biweekly journals
Publications established in 2011
Evolutionary biology journals